The 1992 European Archery Championships is  the 12nd edition of the European Archery Championships. The event was held in Valletta, Malta from 22 to 27 June, 1992.

Medal table

Medal summary

Recurve

References

External links
 World Archery Europe
 Results

European Archery Championships
1992 in archery
International sports competitions hosted by Malta
1992 in European sport